The 1992 Chicago Cubs season was the 121st season of the Chicago Cubs franchise, the 117th in the National League and the 77th at Wrigley Field. The Cubs finished fourth in the National League East with a record of 78–84.

Offseason
 March 30, 1992: George Bell was traded by the Cubs to the Chicago White Sox for Sammy Sosa and Ken Patterson.

Regular season

Season standings

Record vs. opponents

Notable transactions
 July 7, 1992: Ced Landrum was traded by the Cubs to the Milwaukee Brewers for Jeff Kunkel.

Roster

Player stats

Batting

Starters by position
Note: Pos = Position; G = Games played; AB = At bats; H = Hits; Avg. = Batting average; HR = Home runs; RBI = Runs batted in

Other batters
Note: G = Games played; AB = At bats; H = Hits; Avg. = Batting average; HR = Home runs; RBI = Runs batted in

Pitching

Starting pitchers
Note: G = Games pitched; IP = Innings pitched; W = Wins; L = Losses; ERA = Earned run average; SO = Strikeouts

Other pitchers
Note: G = Games pitched; IP = Innings pitched; W = Wins; L = Losses; ERA = Earned run average; SO = Strikeouts

Relief pitchers
Note: G = Games pitched; W = Wins; L = Losses; SV = Saves; ERA = Earned run average; SO = Strikeouts

Farm system 

LEAGUE CHAMPIONS: GenevaAZL club affiliation shared with Colorado Rockies

References

1992 Chicago Cubs season at Baseball Reference

Chicago Cubs seasons
Chicago Cubs Season, 1992
Cub